Cass Township is the name of the following places in the U.S. state of Pennsylvania:
Cass Township, Huntingdon County, Pennsylvania
Cass Township, Schuylkill County, Pennsylvania

See also
 Cass Township (disambiguation)

Pennsylvania township disambiguation pages